Croaghaun is a mountain in County Carlow, Ireland, one of the Blackstairs Mountains.

Croaghaun is the most northerly summit in the Blackstairs Mountains. It is the 603rd highest summit in Ireland.

See also
List of mountains in Ireland

Mountains and hills of County Wexford